Luminate may refer to:

 Luminate (band), an American contemporary Christian music band
 Luminate (company), a music sales data provider